Hverfjall (also known as Hverfell ) is a tephra cone or tuff ring volcano in northern Iceland, to the east of Mývatn.

It erupted in 2500 BP in the southern part of the Krafla fissure swarm. The crater is approximately 1 km in diameter.

Tephra has been carried from Hverfjall all over the Mývatn area. A landslide apparently occurred in the south part of the crater during the eruption, which accounts for the disruption to the round shape of the mountain. During the Age of Settlement, lava flowed from Svörtuborgir , at the southern end of Námafjall , around Hverfjall, which was nearly engulfed by the lava. At the same time an eruption occurred in the slopes above the valley of Hlíðardalur .

The rim of the crater is only accessible by two paths, from the northwest and south. It is strictly forbidden to use other routes in ascent or descent.

References

External links

Volcanoes of Iceland
Active volcanoes
Cinder cones
North Volcanic Zone of Iceland